British Council, Karachi is located in Karachi, Sindh, Pakistan.

The British Council is a British organisation specialising in international educational and cultural opportunities. It is registered as a charity both in England and Wales and Scotland. Founded in 1934 as the British Committee for Relations with Other Countries, and granted a royal charter by King George VI in 1940, the British Council was inspired by Sir Reginald (Rex) Leeper's recognition of the importance of "cultural propaganda" in promoting British interests. Its "sponsoring department" within the United Kingdom Government is the Foreign and Commonwealth Office, although it has day-to-day operational independence.

In Pakistan, British Council have been working since 1948 in the areas of arts, education and English in all four provinces as well as in Azad Kashmir, Gilgit-Baltistan and FATA through offices in Karachi, Lahore and Islamabad.

See also
 Alliance Française
 Goethe-Institut, Karachi
 Alliance Française de Karachi

References

External links 
 British Council

Cultural promotion organisations in Karachi
Pakistan–United Kingdom relations
1948 establishments in Pakistan
 
Organizations established in 1948